Local elections were held in Pasay on May 13, 2010, as part of the general elections. Voters elected the mayor, vice-mayor, representative of the city's lone district in House of Representatives and six members of the city council in each district.

Background

Mayoral and vice-mayoral candidates 
 Mayor Atty. Wenceslao "Peewee" Trinidad sought for his fourth nonconsecutive term. His partner was former Vice Mayor Greg Alcera, his Chief of Staff.
 Vice Mayor Antonino "Tony" Calixto was term limited, and he ran as mayor. His running mate was Second District Councilor Arnel Regino "Moti" Arceo.
 Former Representative and defeated 2007 mayoral candidate Ma. Consuelo "Tita Connie" Dy ran again for mayoral post. Her partner was First District Councilor Marlon Pesebre.
 Ricardo "Ding" Santos ran again for mayoral post. His partner was Leopoldo "Babes" Calixto II. 
 Other independent candidates were Romulo "Rome" Marcelo, Ralph Joseph, and Francisco Penaflor.
Second District Councilor Noel "Onie" Bayona ran as Vice-Mayor, independently.

Representatives, Lone District of Pasay City 

 Rep. Jose Antonio Roxas ran for second term. 
 Second District Councilor Imelda Calixto-Rubiano ran.
 Former Second District Councilor, Acting Mayor and defeated 2007 representative candidate Allan Panaligan ran again for second time.
 Rica Hortaleza, daughter of mayoral candidate Ricardo "Ding" Santos ran.

Candidates

Administration's Ticket

Team Trinidad Alcera Roxas

Opposition Team

Team Calixto

Team Connie Dy

Team Kaibigan

Team Bayona

Results 
Names written in bold-Italic are the re-elected incumbents while in italic are incumbents lost in elections.

For Representative, Lone District of Pasay 
Rep. Jose Antonio "Lito" Roxas was defeated by Second District Councilor Imelda Calixto-Rubiano. Rubiano won in a tight election between Roxas and Panaligan.

For Mayor
Mayor Wenceslao "Peewee" Trinidad was defeated by Vice Mayor Antonino "Tony" Calixto. Calixto won in a tight election between Dy and Trinidad.

For Vice Mayor
First District Councilor Marlon Pesebre won in a tight election between Bayona, Alcera, and Arceo.

For Councilor

First District
Three of the six incumbents were re-elected.  

Former Councilor Eduardo Advincula, father of re-electionist Richard Advincula, made a comeback to the city council.  

Alberto Alvina and Pinky Lyn Francisco were the newly-elected councilors.  

Ma. Luisa Petallo failed to won for a second term, placing 7th. 

Former Councilor Romulo Cabrera, father of three-termer Councilor Jonathan Cabrera, failed to win a bid in city council seat, placing 8th.  

Other former councilors who failed to made city council comeback were Reynaldo Mateo, Florencio Mateo, and Teodulo Lorca. 

|-bgcolor=black
|colspan=5|

Second District
Three of the six incumbents were re-elected.  

Ileana Ibay, daughter of former Councilor Emmanuel Ibay, placed 3rd. Former SK Federation President and ex-officio councilor Brian Bayona, son of vice mayoral candidate Noel Bayona, was freshly elected as city councilor. Former Councilor and defeated 2007 vice mayoral candidate Arvin "Bong" Tolentino made a comeback in the city council, placing 6th. 

Joven "Jojie" Claudio, son of former Mayor Jovito Claudio; Aileen Padua-Lopez, daughter of re-electionist Reynaldo "Rey" Padua; and Jennifer "Jen" Panaligan, wife of former Acting Mayor and Second District Councilor Allan Panaligan were both failed to secure a seat in the city council. 

|-bgcolor=black
|colspan=5|

Note 
Mayor Wenceslao "Peewee" Trinidad was elected as Mayor following the 2000 Pasay mayoral recall election, replacing then-Mayor Jovito Claudio. Trinidad started his first full term as mayor in 2001, and was re-elected in 2004. In 2006, Trinidad, Vice Mayor Antonino Calixto, and nine out of twelve city councilors were put into a six-month preventive suspension due to anomalous garbage collection contracts in 2004 and 2005. Then-Councilor Allan Panaligan served as acting Mayor for six months until the suspension order was lifted in February 2007. According to 1987 Constitution, all elective government officials (except the President and Vice President) can serve for three consecutive full term. Trinidad's supposedly third consecutive term will end in 2010, but due to the suspension, the former's consecutive term was cut, therefore he can run again for another consecutive term thrice.

References

Elections in Pasay
2010 Philippine local elections
2010 elections in Metro Manila